Sathurangam is a 2011 Tamil language political drama film directed by Karu Pazhaniappan, starring Srikanth and Sonia Agarwal. Filming began In 2003, but was stuck in development hell for years. The film's background score was composed by Vidyasagar, and his soundtrack was released in 2010 The project was revived in September 2011, and released on 7 October 2011.  Srikanth's character in the film is named after Thirupathisamy, the late director of the films Azad and Narasimha, who was Karu Pazhaniappan's close friend.

Plot
Thirupathisamy aka Thiru (Srikanth) is an investigative journalist working for a Tamil magazine. He fearlessly brings out the issues in the prevailing political system which earns him many enemies. Thiru falls in love with Sandhya (Sonia Agarwal), a college student. Thiru, in one of his articles, writes about the problems faced by prisoners following which the SP Rajan (Ganesh Yadav) gets suspended. He also writes about the corruption of an IAS officer leading to his transfer and about the real estate mafia run by an influential man Singaperumal. (Mahadevan).

One day, Sandhya gets kidnapped and Thiru gets a threatening call. But Thiru is unable to trace the culprit as he has so many enemies. Initially, he suspects Singaperumal but later finds that Rajan was the man behind the kidnap. Thiru flashes Sandhya's pictures in the magazines and finds out that Rajan has planned to sell her to a brothel in Dubai. Thiru rushes to the railway station where Sandhya is present. He fights against Rajan and kills him. Singaperumal comes to the spot and helps Thiru escape. Finally, Thiru and Sandhya are united.

Cast

Srikanth as Thirupathisamy
Sonia Agarwal as Sandhya
Manivannan as MD
Mahadevan as Singaperumal
Vijayan as Thiru's father
Ilavarasu as Analaar
T. P. Gajendran as Jailmate 
Manobala as Thiru's neighbor
Ganesh Yadav as Jail Superintendent Rajan
Sriman as Sandhya's brother, Chandran 
Bose Venkat as sekar
Saranya Ponvannan as Analaar's wife
Vinodhini as Sandhya's sister in law
Chitra Lakshmanan
Mayilsamy as peon
Thennavan as Singaperumal's henchman
Aryan as Jeeva
 Muthukaalai as Newspaper waste collector
 Nagesh Krishnamurthy as Singaperumal's accountant
Thangamani Prabhu

Production
After the success of Parthiban Kanavu, Karu Pazhaniyappan and Srikanth reunited again for a project called "Sadhurangam" during December 2003. Sonia Agarwal was selected to play the heroine. Srikanth's character in the film is named after Thirupathisamy, the late director of the films Azad and Narasimha, who was Karu Pazhaniappan's close friend.

Soundtrack

Critical reception
Behindwoods wrote:"Sathurangam is proof of the fact that a good story never gets outdated". Nowrunning wrote:"A perfect thriller with its heart in the right place".

References

External links
 

2011 films
2010s Tamil-language films
Films scored by Vidyasagar
Indian action drama films
Films about kidnapping in India
Films about journalists
Journalism adapted into films
Films directed by Karu Pazhaniappan
2011 action drama films